Fiona McIntosh (born 24 June 1960) is a Scottish writer and retired fencer.

Biography
McIntosh was born in Edinburgh, Scotland and educated at Fitzwilliam College, Cambridge. During her fencing career, she was British champion four times, she won the Commonwealth Fencing Championships in 1990, collected a total of 12 Commonwealth medals and competed in the 1984, 1988, 1992 and 1996 Summer Olympics, reaching the finals in Barcelona 1992.

She has written articles for magazines, and worked with photographer Shaen Adey to produce books including Seven Days in Mauritius and Table Mountain Activity Guide, both published by Random House imprint Struik in 2004.

References

External links
 

1960 births
Living people
Alumni of Fitzwilliam College, Cambridge
Fencers at the 1984 Summer Olympics
Fencers at the 1988 Summer Olympics
Fencers at the 1992 Summer Olympics
Fencers at the 1996 Summer Olympics
Olympic fencers of Great Britain
Scottish female fencers
Scottish women writers
Sportspeople from Edinburgh